Cell division cycle 73, Paf1/RNA polymerase II complex component, homolog (S. cerevisiae), also known as CDC73 and parafibromin, is a protein which in humans is encoded by the CDC73 gene.

Function

Parafibromin, LEO1, PAF1, and CTR9 form the PAF protein complex, which associates with the RNA polymerase II subunit POLR2A and with a histone methyltransferase complex.

Clinical significance

Mutations in the CDC73 gene are associated with hyperparathyroidism-jaw tumor syndrome (HPT-JT) and parathyroid carcinomas.

See also
 Primary hyperparathyroidism
 Osteitis fibrosa cystica

References

External links
 GeneReviews/NCBI/NIH/UW entry on CDC73-Related Disorders

Further reading